Ion Sideri (born January 19, 1937 in Constanța) is a Romanian sprint canoer who competed in the early 1960s. At the 1960 Summer Olympics in Rome, he finished sixth in the K-1 4 × 500 m event.

References
Sports-reference.com profile

1937 births
Canoeists at the 1960 Summer Olympics
Living people
Olympic canoeists of Romania
Romanian male canoeists
Sportspeople from Constanța
20th-century Romanian people